Mannes is both a surname and a given name. Notable people with the name include:

Surname:
Aaron Mannes (born 1970), American writer
Astrid Mannes (born 1967), German politician
Charlie Mannes (1863–1937), Scottish cricketer
Clara Mannes, (1869–1948), Polish-American musician and music educator
David Mannes (1866–1959), American violinist, conductor, and educator
Leopold Mannes (1899–1964), American musician
Marya Mannes (1904–1990), American writer and critic
Totte Mannes (born 1933), Finnish artist

Given name:
Mannes Francken (1888–1948), Dutch footballer

See also 
Manes (disambiguation)
Mánes Union of Fine Arts, a Czech arts organization
Mane (disambiguation)
Mani (disambiguation)
Manassas (disambiguation)
Manasses (disambiguation)